Jullio del Carretto (died 13 October 1614) was a Roman Catholic prelate who served as Bishop of Casale Monferrato (1594–1614).
 According to Giuseppe Cappelletti, his first name (as his tombstone indicates) was Tullio, not Jullio.

Biography
On 13 July 1594, Jullio del Carretto was appointed Bishop of Casale Monferrato by Pope Clement VIII. On 25 July 1594, he was consecrated bishop by Girolamo Bernerio, Bishop of Ascoli Piceno, with Guillaume de St-Marcel d'Avançon, Archbishop of Embrun, and Marco Antonio Salomone, Bishop of Sora, serving as co-consecrators. He served as Bishop of Casale Monferrato until his death on 13 October 1614. While bishop, he was the principal co-consecrator of Girolamo Palazzuoli, Bishop of Isola (1610); Giambattista Brivio, Bishop of Cremona (1610); and Pietro Bastoni, Bishop of Umbriatico (1611).

See also
Catholic Church in Italy

References

Sources
Bosio, Antonio (1863). Cenni biografici sopra il venerabile servo di Dio Tullio del Carretto di Millesimo, vescovo di Casale . (Savona: tip. Vescovile di Miralta 1863).
Constitutiones Tullii Carretti, episcopi Casalen. In prima dioecesana Synodo promulgatae anno Domini 1597, iiij septembris. (Casale: Bernardus Grassi 1597).

External links
 (for Chronology of Bishops) 
 (for Chronology of Bishops)  

16th-century Italian Roman Catholic bishops
17th-century Italian Roman Catholic bishops
Bishops appointed by Pope Clement VIII
1614 deaths